Nagybárkány is a village in Nógrád County, Hungary with 689 inhabitants (2014). 

Populated places in Nógrád County